Donald Albert Bick (22 February 1936 – 24 January 1992) was an English cricketer. He played for Middlesex from 1954 to 1967 as a right-handed lower-order batsman who bowled right-arm off-spin. He was born at Hampstead, London.

His highest first-class score was 85, for L.C. Stevens' XI against Cambridge University in 1960. He twice took his best bowling figures of 5 for 22: for Middlesex against Yorkshire in 1959 and for Middlesex against Cambridge University in 1965.

He played Minor Counties cricket for Hertfordshire from 1968 to 1974.

References

External links
Donald Bick at ESPNcricinfo
Donald Bick at CricketArchive

1936 births
1992 deaths
People from Hampstead
English cricketers
Middlesex cricketers
Marylebone Cricket Club cricketers
Hertfordshire cricketers
English cricket coaches
L. C. Stevens' XI cricketers